The Reedling is a one-design, fractional rigged keelboat designed and built by Reedling Yachts Ltd (now dissolved), Horning, Norfolk, UK. 
The Reedlings class flag is the International Code of Signals Flag for the letter K

History

There were only 11 Reedlings built, starting in 1963:

International competition

The Reedling class of keelboat is only raced at Horning Sailing Club, based in the Reeding's home village of Horning, Norfolk, UK.

External links
 The Green Book class details
 Boats of the Norfolk Broads - Reedling Gallery

Keelboats

fi:Hai-vene